The Ramakrishna is a nonprofit social institution, which serves the low-income community of Betim and the surrounding region in Brazil. The institution has a wide range of projects, from improving public education for children, to the professionalization of teenagers and alphabetization classes to the elderly. Due to the large extent of their projects and the reach of an audience with more than 30,000 individuals in the region, Ramakrishna gained notoriety in the media, with government partnerships in the city of Betim and the state of Minas Gerais, as well as educational institutions and national and international companies as Petrobras, C&A

History
Based upon the work of Sri Ramakrishna, the Ramakrishna was founded in 1959 by professor Arlinda Coria da Silva in the city of Betim, Minas Gerais, Brazil. Between 1963 and 1964, Prof. Arlinda opened the first two buildings of the institution, which provided internships for children at social risk. From 1992 afterwards, Ramakrishna services were opened to the general public of the region, boosting Ramakrishna's growth and its general need for projects, due to the need for a bigger institution to attend to the needs of the community. Until 2011, the Ramakrishna already had 21 social projects, and it occupied a vast area with multiple buildings.

Work policy
The Ramakrishna Institution was established with the goal of promoting social welfare, education, job training, culture, environmental awareness, recreation and sports for children and adolescents in vulnerable situations, and living in suburban neighborhoods and rural areas of the city of Betim. Parallel to this work, Ramakrishna works with their families.

References

External links 
 Ramakrishna - Official site (in English)
 Cooperative Futurate - Project da Ramakrishna com par ceria da Petrobras (in Brazilian Portuguese)

Social welfare charities
Non-profit organisations based in Brazil